Cretan hieroglyphs are a hieroglyphic writing system used in early Bronze Age Crete, during the Minoan era. They predate Linear A by about a century, but the two writing systems continued to be used in parallel for most of their history. , they are undeciphered.

Corpus
As of 1989, the corpus of Cretan hieroglyphic inscriptions included two parts:
 Seals and sealings, 150 documents with 307 sign-groups, using 832 signs in all.
 Other documents on clay, 120 documents with 274 sign-groups, using 723 signs.

More documents, such as those from the Petras deposit, have been published since then. A four sided prism was found in 2011 at Vrysinas in western Crete.

These inscriptions were mainly excavated at four locations: 
"Quartier Mu" at Malia (Middle Minoan II period = MM II)
Malia palace (MM III)
Knossos (MM II or III)
the Petras deposit (MM IIB), excavated starting in 1995 and published in 2010.

The first corpus of signs was published by Evans in 1909. The current corpus (which excludes some of Evan's signs) was published in 1996 as the Corpus Hieroglyphicarum Inscriptionum Cretae (CHIC). It consists of:
 clay documents with incised inscriptions (CHIC H: 1–122)
 sealstone impressions (CHIC I: 123–179)
 sealstones (CHIC S: 180–314)
 the Malia altar stone
 the Arkalochori Axe
 seal fragment HM 992, showing a single symbol, identical to Phaistos Disk glyph 21.

The relation of the last two items with the script of the main corpus is uncertain; the Malia altar is listed as part of the Hieroglyphic corpus by most researchers.

Since the publication of the CHIC in 1996 refinements and changes have been proposed.

Some Cretan Hieroglyphic (as well as Linear A) inscriptions were also found on the island of Samothrace in the northeastern Aegean.

It has been suggested that there was an evolution of the hieroglyphs into the linear scripts. Also, some relations to Anatolian hieroglyphs have been suggested:

Signs

The glyph inventory in CHIC includes 96 syllabograms representing sounds, ten of which double as logograms, representing words or portions of words.

There are also 23 logograms representing four levels of numerals (units, tens, hundreds, thousands), numerical fractions, and two types of punctuation.

Many symbols have apparent Linear A counterparts, so that it is tempting to insert Linear B sound values. Moreover, there are multiple parallels (words and phrases) from hieroglyphic inscriptions that occur also in Linear A and/or B in similar contexts (words for "total", toponyms, personal names etc.)

It has been suggested that several signs were influenced by Egyptian hieroglyphs.

Chronology 

The development of hieroglyphs passed 3 important stages:
 Arkhanes script (signs look like pictograms, although their number and frequency rather suggest a syllabic script); this script was only described as a distinct stage in development of the Cretan hieroglyphic in the 1980s. Most of these seals contain a repetitive "Arkhanes formula" of 2-3 signs.
 Hieroglyphic A (best represented in archaeological records; similar to Arkhanes, but images of animals are reduced to heads only)
 Hieroglyphic B (mostly on clay, characters are essentially simplified, may have served as a prototype for Linear A and possibly the Cypro-Minoan script). Only this latter version of the hieroglyphic includes signs that can possibly match ideograms known from Linear A.

The sequence and the geographical spread of Cretan hieroglyphs, Linear A, and Linear B, the five overlapping, but distinct, writing systems of Bronze Age Crete and the Greek mainland can be summarized as follows:

Fonts
The Aegean and Cretan Hieroglyphs fonts support Cretan hieroglyphs.

See also
 Eteocretan language

Notes

References

Works cited

Further reading
 W. C. Brice, Notes on the Cretan Hieroglyphic Script: I. The Corpus. II. The Clay Bar from Malia, H20, Kadmos 29 (1990) 1-10.
 W. C. Brice, Cretan Hieroglyphs & Linear A, Kadmos 29 (1990) 171-2.
 W. C. Brice, Notes on the Cretan Hieroglyphic Script: III. The Inscriptions from Mallia Quarteir Mu. IV. The Clay Bar from Knossos, P116, Kadmos 30 (1991) 93-104.
 W. C. Brice, Notes on the Cretan Hieroglyphic Script, Kadmos 31 (1992), 21-24.
 M. Civitillo, LA SCRITTURA GEROGLIFICA MINOICA SUI SIGILLI. Il messaggio della glittica protopalaziale, Biblioteca di Pasiphae XII, Pisa-Roma 2016.
 G. M. Facchetti La questione della scrittura «geroglifica cretese» dopo la recente edizione del corpus dei testi. Pasiphae: Rivista di filologia e antichita egee. 2007.
 Silvia Ferrara, "The Making of a Script: Cretan Hieroglyphic and the Quest for Its Origins", Bulletin of ASOR, vol. 386, pp. 1–22, November 2021
 
 Jasink, Anna Margherita. "The So-called klasmatograms on Cretan Hieroglyphic Seals" , KADMOS, vol. 44, no. 1-2, 2005, pp. 23-39
 G. A. Owens, The Common Origin of Cretan Hieroglyphs and Linear A, Kadmos 35:2 (1996), 105–110.
 G. A. Owens, An Introduction to «Cretan Hieroglyphs»: A Study of «Cretan Hieroglyphic» Inscriptions in English Museums (excluding the Ashmolean Museum Oxford),  Cretan Studies VIII (2002), 179–184.
 Perna, Massimo. "A seal in the British Museum with a Cretan Hieroglyphic inscription (CR (?) S (1/1) 07)" Kadmos, vol. 58, no. 1-2, 2019, pp. 49-60
 
 
 I. Schoep, A New Cretan Hieroglyphic Inscription from Malia (MA/V Yb 03), Kadmos 34 (1995), 78–80.
 J. G. Younger, The Cretan Hieroglyphic Script: A Review Article, Minos 31-32 (1996–1997) 379–400.

External links 
 
 The Cretan Hieroglyphic Texts
 Cretan Hieroglyphic Texts Explorer

 
Undeciphered writing systems